Frogger 2 is the title of three video games:

Frogger II: ThreeeDeep! (1984)
Frogger 2: Swampy's Revenge (2000)
Frogger 2 (Xbox Live Arcade) (2008)